Eid is a former municipality in the old Hordaland county, Norway.  The municipality existed only for a short time, from 1838 until 1855 and it is now part of Kvinnherad Municipality in Vestland county.  The municipality encompassed most of the island of Halsnøy as well as some small surrounding areas. The administrative centre was located in the village of Eidsvik on the island of Halsnøy. Eid Church was the main church for the municipality.

History

The parish of Eid was established as a municipality on 1 January 1838 (see formannskapsdistrikt law). In 1855, Eid municipality was incorporated into the neighboring municipality of Fjelberg. Before the merger, Eid had a population of 1,207.

See also
List of former municipalities of Norway

References

Kvinnherad
Former municipalities of Norway
1838 establishments in Norway
1855 disestablishments in Norway